Kampong Sungai Kelugos is a village in Tutong District, Brunei, about  from the district town Pekan Tutong. The population was 900 in 2016. It is one of the villages within Mukim Keriam.

Mosque 
Pengiran Anak Isteri Pengiran Anak Sarah (PAIPAS) Mosque is the village mosque. It is named after Princess Sarah, the consort of Crown Prince Al-Muhtadee Billah.

References 

Sungai Kelugos